Homer Nelson (February 6, 1826 – May 21, 1894) was a member of the Wisconsin State Assembly during the 1877 session.

Nelson was born on February 6, 1826, in Hebron, New York. He owned a farm in Portage County. Nelson served as treasurer of Green Lake County, Wisconsin. He was a Republican.

References

External links

People from Hebron, New York
People from Green Lake County, Wisconsin
County treasurers in Wisconsin
1826 births
1894 deaths
19th-century American politicians
Republican Party members of the Wisconsin State Assembly